William de Kingescote was an English medieval university chancellor.

During 1289–90, William de Kingescote was Chancellor of the University of Oxford. He was admitted by the Bishop of Lincoln, Oliver Sutton.

References

Year of birth unknown
Year of death unknown
Chancellors of the University of Oxford
13th-century English people